Murt may refer to:

Places
Albania
 Murt, Albania

Iran
 Murt, Ilam (مورت)
 Murt-e Hadi, Kermanshah Province
 Murt-e Sabz, Kermanshah Province
 Murt, Khuzestan (مورت)
 Murt, Lorestan (مورت)
 Murt, Sistan and Baluchestan (مورت)

Other uses
 Murt (name)
Murt Weber, A web developer from Zipnosis